Bristol Brunel Academy is a mixed sex Secondary Academy, located in Speedwell in the ward of Hillfields, Bristol, England. The academy is named after Isambard Kingdom Brunel. The Academy is part of the Cabot Learning Federation which is sponsored by the University of the West of England and Rolls-Royce.

History
The site was originally the location of 2 single sex schools which became a mixed sex school called Speedwell Secondary School in the 1960s. A large part of the school burnt down in the mid 1970s, temporary classrooms were used while the school was rebuilt. The school became the first specialist school in Bristol when it changed to a technology college in 1997. The original buildings were in use up to July 2007 after which all the old school was completely demolished. Building for the new academy was undertaken on the site of the existing school in early 2006 by the construction company Skanska. The academy was officially opened in September 2007 by the then Prime Minister Gordon Brown and Ed Balls. The main school building was designed by Wilkinson Eyre Architects.

Brigid Allen was the former Principal of the Academy. Guy Keith-Miller is the Chair of the Council.

Academic achievement
The school has improved its results over the period from 2008 and achieved its best ever GCSE score in 2014. The table below shows the percentage of students gaining 5 A*-C including English and Mathematics.  The results of other LEA schools in the Bristol area are, on average, 10% higher than this.

Notable alumni
Kenny Stephens a former professional footballer.
Justin Lee Collins a television presenter/comedian.

References

External links

Cabot Learning Federation
Wired-gov.net
Itpro.co.uk
News.bbc.co.uk

Secondary schools in Bristol
Academies in Bristol
Educational institutions established in 2007
2007 establishments in England